Donald Wood (28 May 1889 – 12 March 1953) was a British painter. His work was part of the painting event in the art competition at the 1932 Summer Olympics.

References

1889 births
1953 deaths
20th-century British painters
British male painters
Olympic competitors in art competitions
Artists from Leeds
19th-century British male artists
20th-century British male artists